Cut to the Chase is a compilation album by Vampire Rodents, released on November 12, 2019, by Rodentia Productions. The album compiles tracks from outside the band's main discography, namely the previously unreleased songs "Cut to the Chase", "Henry Catwallace", "Lizardman" and "Blind Acceleration", remixed tracks by Chemlab, Killing Floor and Penal Colony and the song "Cocked, Loaded & Ready" with the original opening intact.

Track listing

Personnel
Adapted from the Cut to the Chase liner notes.

Axon Tremolo
 Daniel Vahnke – sampler, remixer (3, 7-11, 14, 15), vocals (1, 4, 5)
 Victor Wulf – keyboards (5)

Additional performers
 James Basore – drums, drum programming and tape (10)
 John Belew – sampler, electronics, programming (10)
 Marc C. Bennett – guitar (6)
 Chase – percussion and loops (1, 2, 4, 6, 12-14)
 Dave Creadeau – vocals (12)
 Mark Edwards – sampler and vocals (8)
 Mel Hammond – vocals (6)
 Jason Hubbard – sampler, programming and drum programming (7, 9, 11)
 Mark Kermanj – drums (3, 15)
 Jared Louche – arrangements and vocals (3, 15)
 Dee Madden – vocals (7, 9, 11, 13), sampler and programming (7, 9, 11)
 Boom chr Paige – vocals (12)
 Marc Phillips –  guitar, bass guitar and backing vocals (10)
 Dylan Thomas More – programming, loops and sampler (3, 15)
 Andy Shaw – guitar and backing vocals (7, 9, 11)
 Chris Shinkus – bass guitar and backing vocals (7, 9, 11)
 Karl Tellefsen – guitar and bass guitar (10)
 Ned Wahl – bass guitar (3, 15)
 Steve "Fly" Watson – guitar (3, 15)
 Christian Void – vocals (10, 14), sampler and electronics (10)

Production
 Joan McAninch – engineering (6, 12-14), mastering (6)
 Neil Wojewodzki – editing, mastering, mixing (6) post-mastering (6)

Release history

References

External links 
 Cut to the Chase at Discogs (list of releases)
 Cut to the Chase at Bandcamp
 Cut to the Chase at iTunes

2019 compilation albums
Vampire Rodents albums